The Lonely Island Presents: The Unauthorized Bash Brothers Experience is a Netflix special by comedy rap group The Lonely Island. Billed as a "visual poem", the special is directed by Mike Diva and Akiva Schaffer and stars Andy Samberg as Jose Canseco and Schaffer as Mark McGwire. It is presented as a rap album written and performed by Canseco and McGwire in the 1980s, when the pair was known as the Bash Brothers while playing for the Oakland Athletics. It was released along with an accompanying album on May 23, 2019. It was timed with the 30th anniversary of the A's 1989 championship season.

Cast
Andy Samberg as Jose Canseco
Akiva Schaffer as Mark McGwire
Jorma Taccone as Reporter / Walt Weiss / Joe Montana
Hannah Simone as Amber
Jenny Slate as Stacy
Sterling K. Brown as Sia
Jim O'Heir as Puka Shell Bob
Maya Rudolph as Val Gal
Stephanie Beatriz as Val Gal
Este Haim as Val Gal
Danielle Haim as Val Gal
Alana Haim as Val Gal
Whitney Moore as Snow Bunny
D. Paul Faulkner as Mark's Dad
Dan Wicksman as Maitre D'

Album
An accompanying album was released the day of the special's premiere, performed by The Lonely Island.

Track listing

References

External links
 
 

English-language television shows
Films directed by Akiva Schaffer
Netflix specials